Malacosoma castrense (or Malacosoma castrensis), the ground lackey, is a moth of the family Lasiocampidae. It is a tent caterpillar found in Europe. The species was first described by Carl Linnaeus in his 1758 10th edition of Systema Naturae. The moth's habitats are salt marshes and estuaries.

Distribution and habitat
The habitat is salt marsh and estuary. It is not particularly common due to this specialist habitat, but neither is it a threatened species.

Life cycle and behaviour
Eggs are laid in rings around plant stalks, and can survive immersion in salt water. The blue-grey larvae feed on various shrubs and herbaceous plants such as heather, cypress spurge, and Lotus species, and other plants found in their habitat except grasses, but they can be fed apple or hawthorn foliage in captivity. The ground lackey larva is a tent caterpillar. which makes a new tent with each moult. Fully-grown caterpillars are fast walkers. The pupa is not cocooned.

Adults fly from June to August, depending on the location. The length of the forewings is 13–16 mm for males and 17–21 mm for females. They fly at night.

Subspecies
Malacosoma castrense castrense
Malacosoma castrense kirghisicum (Staudinger, 1879) (Asia Minor, Kazakhstan, Turkmenia, Uzbekistan)
Malacosoma castrense thomalae Gaede, 1932 (Tien-Shan)

References

External links

Lepidoptera of Belgium
Lepiforum e.V.
De Vlinderstichting 

Malacosoma
Moths described in 1758
Moths of Europe
Moths of Asia
Taxa named by Carl Linnaeus